Taungoo Educational College is located at Taungoo, Bago Division, Myanmar. Formerly it was the Convent High School under the Taungoo, Roman Catholic Diocese. After nationalization, it became Teacher's Training College. In 2000, the named has been changed to Taungoo Educational College and the government upgraded the level. Primarily a teacher training college, the college offers bachelor's and master's in education to the country's prospective primary, secondary and tertiary school teachers.

Programs
Diploma in Teacher Education (DTEd)
Bachelor of Science in Education(BSc.Ed)
Bachelor of Art in Education (BA.Ed)
Postgraduate Preservice Primary Teacher Training (PPTT)

Affiliated universities and colleges
Along with the Yangon Institute of Education, the Taungoo Educational College is affiliated with 21 educational colleges located throughout the country.

Bogalay Education College
Dawei Education College
Hlegu Education College
Hpa-An Education College
Kyaukphyu Education College
Lashio Education College
Magway Education College
Mandalay Education College
Mawlamyaing Education College
Monywa Education College
Meiktila Education College
Myaungmya Education College
Myitkyina Education College
Pakokku Education College
Pathein Education College
Pyay Education College
Sagaing Education College
Taunggoo Education College
Taunggyi Education College
Thingangyun Education College
Yankin Education College

References
^ "Education in Myanmar". Yangon City Development Committee. https://web.archive.org/web/20081120085050/http://www.yangoncity.com.mm/education/index.asp. Retrieved 2008-12-31.

Educational institutions with year of establishment missing
Universities and colleges in Taungoo
Universities and colleges in Bago Region
Arts and Science universities in Myanmar
Universities and colleges in Myanmar